A ranch school is a type of school used in rural areas of the Western United States.

History
The ranch school movement began in the Western United States in the early 1900s as a way to educate children who lived on ranches in remote and rural areas, far away from regular schools in the towns and cities. The idea was popular and within a short time many ranch schools took on a boarding school type of application, similar to a dude ranch concept, where Easterners or city-dwellers could send their children as well.

At the time, Americans widely believed that the arid climate of the Western states could help children suffering from conditions like asthma recuperate. The hard work that went with living and working on a ranch and spending a lot of time outdoors was also appealing to those who wanted their children to grow up strong, healthy and independent. Most ranch school students rode a horse every day and were taught the basics of ranching and living outdoors, in addition to regular school teachings.

Arizona led the nation in the number of ranch schools, most of which were in the Tucson area. Many were for boys only, but there were some all-girls schools as well, such as the Hacienda del Sol school outside of Tucson or the Jokake School in Scottsdale. Most of the ranch schools were built for locals, but some ranchers - such as those at the Little Outfit Ranch in Arizona's San Rafael Valley - established ranches with the specific intention of operating them as boarding schools for "city boys".

Ranch schools were advertised in magazines and newspapers, drawing in students and their families from across the country, and as a result are accredited with contributing to the growth of the tourism industry in the Southwest in the early 1900s. By the 1960s, most of the ranch schools in the United States were closed or soon-to-be closed, marking the end of the traditional ranch school movement. However, some ranch schools have survived, such as Deep Springs College.

Many contemporary ranch schools are therapeutic boarding schools for "troubled teens".

Gallery

See also

 One-room school
 Open-air school
 American Indian boarding schools
 Mace-Kingsley Ranch School

References

 
School types
History of Arizona
Education in the United States